Volleyball at the 2011 Games of the Small States of Europe was held from 31 May – 4 June 2011.

Medal summary

Men

Women

Medal table

Men

Indoor

|}

|}

Beach

|}

|}

Women

Indoor

|}

|}

Beach

Pool A

|}

|}

Pool B

|}

|}

Knockout stage

Fifth place game

|}

Semifinals

|}

Third place game

|}

Final

|}

References
Volleyball Site of the 2011 Games of the Small States of Europe
Men´s Indoor Results
Women´s Indoor Results
Beach Results

2011 in volleyball
2011 Games of the Small States of Europe
2011